The Third Battle of Manzanillo was a naval engagement that occurred on July 18, 1898, between an American fleet commanded by Chapman C. Todd against a Spanish fleet led by Joaquín Gómez de Barreda, which occurred during the Spanish–American War. The significantly more powerful United States Navy squadron, consisting of four gunboats, two armed tugs and a patrol yacht, overpowered a Royal Spanish Navy squadron which consisted of four gunboats, three pontoon used as floating batteries and three transports, sinking or destroying all the Spanish ships present without losing a single ship of their own. The victory came on the heels of a more significant American success at the Battle of Santiago de Cuba, and was the third largest naval engagement of the war after Santiago de Cuba and the Battle of Manila Bay.

Tensions between Spain and the United States worsened over Spanish behavior during their efforts to quell a revolution in their colony of Cuba, with the American public being agitated by largely falsified reports of Spanish atrocities against the Cuban population. In January 1898, in the interest of safeguarding American interests in Cuba, the cruiser USS Maine was dispatched to the island. In February 1898, the Maine exploded while lying at anchor in Havana harbor, killing more than half her crew and inflaming American opinion against Spain, with the Spanish being portrayed as the culprit in the American media regardless of the actual source of the explosion. Two months later, war was declared.

After defeating the largest Spanish squadron stationed in Cuba, the United States Navy continued dispatching warships to defeat the remaining Spanish naval presence on the island, as they had done upon the outbreak of war. The port of Manzanillo contained a significant Spanish naval presence in addition to being a haven for Spanish blockade runners, and the Americans had attempted twice before to destroy the squadron lying at anchor, with both the first and second attempts having been repulsed. On the third attempt, all U.S. naval elements in the area, reinforced by two Wilmington-class gunboats combined forces under the command of Chapman C. Todd to destroy the Spanish vessels once and for all.

The seven-ship force split into three different groups and entered the harbor at the same time to ensure the Spanish vessels had no path of escape. They first targeted the three transports and destroyed them while they were lying at anchor, alongside repulsing several gunboats who moved to repulse the Americans. The seven ships then moved further in the harbor to engage the gunboats and the immobile pontoon. All gunboats and transports were quickly destroyed or sunk, with minimal casualties for the Americans, with the only casualty being damage incurred to the lone armed tug. Although the battle destroyed the small Spanish squadron in the harbor, the Spanish defenders inside the town refused to relinquish control of the city to the Americans, leading to the Fourth Battle of Manzanillo, resulting in the town falling into American hands.

Background 

Upon the outbreak of war, the United States Navy had placed a blockade around the island of Cuba, both to assist the local revolutionaries fighting against Spanish rule, and to hamper Spanish efforts to resist the American expeditionary forces by ensuring they could not move around men and supplies to areas which required them. Several ports in Cuba, such as Cárdenas and Cienfuegos had already seen several unsuccessful attempts by the Americans to attack the ports, with the Battle of Cárdenas proving to be the most costly American failure. Spanish blockade runners would move from port to port to skirt the American blockade, bringing vital men and material to Spanish soldiers engaged in combat with the Cubans. The port of Manzanillo had been a refuge for Spanish troop transports and blockade runners (many of which were requisitioned merchant steamships) since the outbreak of war, and the United States Navy had already dispatched two reconnaissance expeditions to the harbor to determine its defenses.

Accurate fire from the four Spanish gunboats in the harbor, Estrella, Guantánamo, Centinela and the Delgado Parejo forced an American withdrawal, with only three casualties and damaged vessels to show for their efforts. Wrote one American sailor:

The commanding officer of the Wilmington, Chapman C. Todd, became commander of the now seven-vessel strong American force, and moved to clear the harbor of Spanish vessels. Todd ordered his vessels to be split up into three groups, with the two gunboats Wilmington and Helena being ordered to enter the harbor via a channel on the northern side of the bay and attacking from the left, Osceola and Scorpion being ordered to attack from a channel directly opposite the city, and the Wompatuck, Hist and Hornet being ordered to move in from the right through one of the bays southern channels. All three of the American squadrons were instructed to time their passages through the channels to enter the bay concurrently. The reason behind the division of the squadron was to prevent any Spanish vessels from escaping by blocking their escape routes.

Battle 

At 07:00am, the seven American warships began to approach the harbor of Manzanillo, having rendezvoused at Guayabal the night before. Just four minutes later the battle began when Spanish shore batteries noticed the approaching Americans and began firing at them, although they scored no hits. Some fifteen minutes later, the Scorpion and Osceola replied by opening fire on the shore batteries, although they likewise were unable to score any hits. At 07:50am, the Americans sighted the three Spanish transports lying at anchor, these being the El Gloria, Jose Garcia and El Purísima Concepción. El Gloria and Jose Garcia were merchant steamers used for transporting troops while the El Purísima Concepción was a blockade runner. All three vessels were destroyed over a two and a half hour period by the Americans, who were careful to remain out of the range of the Spanish batteries.

Upon seeing the plight of their fellow vessels, several Spanish gunboats set sail and moved to repulse the American warships, however they found themselves being repulsed and forced to retreat further inside the harbor due to being outgunned. Hist, Hornet, and Wompatuck pursued the gunboats to their moorings and engaged them. The American vessels continued their advance into the harbor, but they soon ran into issues with the shallow depth of Manzanillo's bay, forcing them to reconnoiter passages so that the deeper-drafted gunboats, the Wilmington and the Helena, would not beach themselves accidentally. Advancing upon the Spanish positions, Todd realised that his forces were focusing too much of their fire upon transports taking refuge in the harbor alongside the immobile pontoon present, the hulk and storeship Maria, and ordered the Helena to switch to targeting the cornered gunboats instead of assisting the Willmington with finishing the transports and pontoon off.

With the transports and pontoons destroyed, all the American efforts were switched to finishing off the badly damaged gunboats. One by one, the four gunboats were finished off, with three being destroyed, one being sunk and another beaching itself before sinking later. At 10:22am, just three hours after initiating the engagement, Todd gave the order to withdraw from the harbor. On their way out, much as they had done on their way in, they made sure to keep out of the range of the Spanish batteries, who had helplessly watched the battle unfold. During the battle, Todd had noted the good performance of the officers serving under him, and stated as such in his battle report to Sampson:

Aftermath 

By 10:35am, the battle had been concluded. The Spanish squadron had been entirely destroyed, suffering casualties of three men killed, fourteen men wounded, four gunboats sunk or destroyed and three transports and pontoons burned to the waterline, while the Americans, on the other hand, had suffered no casualties. The only significant damage incurred by the American force was a three-pounder gun that broke loose from its rivets on the Wompatuck, though one of USS Wilmingtons guns was disabled due to Spanish gunfire for a few minutes. The threat posed by the Spanish flotilla was eliminated, and the American squadron returned victorious to the main fleet. The Wompatuck, however, left the rest of the warships and instead sailed towards at Guantánamo Bay where the Americans had established a base after their victory at the Battle of Guantánamo Bay to bring Admiral William T. Sampson news of the latest American victory.

During the battle, the Americans took great care to ensure that their gunfire did not target the city, and in the words of Todd, "so far as could be observed, little, if any, was done." Although the Spanish naval presence in Manzanillo was eliminated, the Spanish defenders in the town stubbornly refused to relinquish control to either the Americans or the Cubans, and even without a naval presence, it took a U.S. Navy bombardment of the town combined with Cuban rebels storming the town for the Spanish to finally surrender the town, when they learnt of the ceasefire that resulted in the end of the war. Manzanillo would be the last town to surrender in Cuba during the war and the last engagement which took place on the island. Four days after the battle, on the 22nd of July, the New York Times published news of the victory to the American public.

References

Bibliography 

 
 
 
 
 
 
 
 
 
 

Naval battles of the Spanish–American War
Battles involving Cuba
Battle of Manzanillo 03
Battle of Manzanillo 03
Conflicts in 1898
Battle of Manzanillo 03